Richard Charles Lucy Court (23 October 1916 – 10 April 1974) was an English first-class cricketer. Court was a right-handed batsman who bowled right-arm fast.

Court made his first-class debut for Hampshire against Lancashire in the 1937 County Championship. Court played three first-class matches for Hampshire in the 1937 season and represented the club in a total of eighteen first-class matches from 1937 until 1939. Court's final first-class match for Hampshire came against Leicestershire during the 1939 County Championship, which was the last before the onset of the Second World War led to county cricket being cancelled until 1946, which in turn brought Court's first-class career to an end.

In Court's eighteen first-class matches for Hampshire he scored 224 runs at a batting average of 10.18 and a high score of 35. With the ball Court took 33 wickets at a bowling average of 37.21, with best figures of 4/53.

Court died at Southampton, Hampshire on 10 April 1974.

External links
Richard Court at Cricinfo
Richard Court at CricketArchive
Matches and detailed statistics for Richard Court

1916 births
1974 deaths
People from Ambala
Cricketers from Haryana
English cricketers
Hampshire cricketers